Joonistatud Mees (The Picture Perfect Man) is the fourth Dagö album, released in 2006.

Track listing
 Muusik (Singer)
 Pöide
 Näitleja (Actor)
 Maantee (Highway)
 Ma jään (I Will Be)
 Hallid majad (Gray Houses)
 Summer
 Armastan sind kaugelt (I Love You From A Distance)
 Joonistatud mees (The Picture Perfect Man)
 Ma ei tea (I Don't Know)
 Tõuseb traavile (On Horse's Back)

References
Dagö's Official Website

2006 albums
Dagö albums
Estonian-language albums